James Edward "Red" Curren (May 12, 1925 – November 13, 2010) was a Canadian basketball player who competed in the 1952 Summer Olympics.
He was part of the Canadian basketball team, which was eliminated after the group stage in the 1952 tournament. He played one match.

References

1925 births
2010 deaths
Basketball people from Ontario
Basketball players at the 1952 Summer Olympics
Canadian men's basketball players
Olympic basketball players of Canada
Place of birth missing
Western Mustangs basketball players